Pleasant Hill is an unincorporated community in Lincoln Parish,  Louisiana, United States.

Notes

Unincorporated communities in Lincoln Parish, Louisiana
Unincorporated communities in Louisiana
Populated places in Ark-La-Tex
Unincorporated communities in Ruston, Louisiana micropolitan area